Neelakantha Bhanu Prakash (born 13 October 1999) is a human calculator from India, and is titled as the "World's Fastest Human Calculator". BBC said "Neelakantha Bhanu Prakash is to math (mental calculation) what Usain Bolt is to running". He won gold in the 2020 Mental Calculation World Championship at Mind Sports Olympiad 2020. He also holds 50 Limca records for his mathematical calculations.

He is the founder of 'Bhanzu', a math education startup.

In 2022, he featured in the Forbes 30 Under 30 Asia 2022 List for heading 'Bhanzu' in the Consumer Technology category

Early life 
Neelakantha Bhanu was born to Srinivas Jonnalagadda and Hema Siva Parvathi in Eluru. In 2005, at the age of five, he met with a head injury that rendered him bedridden for an entire year when he picked up math and calculations. A mathematical whiz kid from early childhood, he began competing in several competitions stating at age five. Neelakantha Bhanu Prakash, a mathematics graduate has bagged many gold medals and has world records for fast arithmetic calculations. He has also won the International Speed Math Champion '13 and National Speed Math Champion '11 & '12, and Math Genius Award in 2015. He completed his schooling at Bharatiya Vidya Bhavan's Public School (Vidyashram) Hyderabad.

He graduated from St. Stephen's College, Delhi in 2020 with a BSc Honours degree in Mathematics. He has also been a speaker at several TED talks.

References 

Mental calculators
Living people
1999 births
St. Stephen's College, Delhi alumni
1996 births
Delhi University alumni